Rafał Klemens Muchacki (born 3 February 1955 in Bielsko-Biała) is a Polish politician. He was elected to the Sejm on 25 September 2005, getting 12,015 votes in 27 Bielsko-Biała district as a candidate from the Civic Platform list.

See also
Members of Polish Sejm 2005-2007

External links
Rafał Muchacki - parliamentary page - includes declarations of interest, voting record, and transcripts of speeches.

Members of the Polish Sejm 2005–2007
Civic Platform politicians
1955 births
Living people